The following is a list of novels based on video games.

English novels

German novels

Japanese novels

References

 
Video game culture
 
Video games
Video games
Lists of works based on video games